The 2003 Legg Mason Tennis Classic was a men's tennis tournament played on outdoor hard courts at the William H.G. FitzGerald Tennis Center in Washington, D.C. in the United States and was part of the International Series of the 2003 ATP Tour.It was the 35th edition of the tournament and ran from July 28 through August 3, 2003. Tenth-seeded Tim Henman won the singles title.

Finals

Singles

 Tim Henman defeated  Fernando González 6–3, 6–4
 It was Henman's 1st singles title of the year and the 10th of his career.

Doubles

 Yevgeny Kafelnikov /  Sargis Sargsian defeated  Chris Haggard /  Paul Hanley 7–5, 4–6, 6–2
 It was Kafelnikov's 2nd title of the year and the 53rd of his career. It was Sargsian's 1st title of the year and the 2nd of his career.

References

External links
 Official website
 ATP tournament profile

Legg Mason Tennis Classic
Washington Open (tennis)
2003 in Washington, D.C.